The Inkeroinen railway station (formerly Inkerois) is located in the town of Kouvola (formerly the town of Anjalankoski), Finland, in the urban area of Inkeroinen. It is located along the Kouvola–Kotka railway, and its neighboring stations are Myllykoski in the north and Tavastila in the south.

Services 
Inkeroinen is served by all commuter trains on the route Kouvola–Kotka; some of these services are operated from or continue towards Lahti as well. Northbound trains towards Kouvola stop on track 1 and southbound trains towards Kotka use track 2. Track 3 is not used by passenger traffic under normal circumstances.

External links

References 

Kouvola
Railway stations in Kymenlaakso